Ludger Wöste (born May 2, 1946 in Emsbüren) is a German physicist and professor at the Free University of Berlin. He is known for research in laser control of chemistry and laser-based weather control through the creation of plasma channels by laser filamentation in air.

Education and career 
Wöste studied physics and electrical engineering at the RWTH Aachen University from 1965 and physics at the University of Bonn from 1968 with a diploma from Herbert Walther in 1972 (deflection of a sodium atom beam in the radiation field of a dye laser) and from 1973 to 1978 as an assistant to Ernst Schumacher at the University of Bern , where he received his doctorate in 1978 (mass selective laser spectroscopy on metal atom clusters). As a postdoc he was with Richard N. Zare at Stanford University until 1980, where he worked on laser chemistry (reactions on optically oriented molecules) and then he was until 1987 project manager (photodynamic behavior of metal clusters) and lecturer at the École polytechnique fédérale de Lausanne, and from 1981 as head of research for laser applications. In 1984, he was a visiting professor at the Aimé Cotton Laboratory of the University of Paris-Sud, where he studied the transition from non-conducting to conducting metal in mercury clusters. From 1989 he was a professor at the Free University of Berlin and from 2007 to 2008 he was dean of the physics department. Since 2014 he has been Wilhelm and Else Heraeus Senior Professor for new teaching concepts in physics.

Research 
Wöste's research focuses on the applications of laser spectroscopy and laser chemistry, including the aspects of ultrafast spectroscopy, catalysis, clusters, optical remote sensing of the atmosphere, He's also known for developments in physics education - among other things he developed a construction kit for demonstration experiments at schools around mass spectrometry and the laser.

In the 2000s, along with his former PhD student Jean-Pierre Wolf, Wöste and colleagues constructed the world's first mobile terawatt laser system, Teramobile. The goal of the project is to induce rainfall through intense laser-induced filamentation in air.

Honors and awards 
Wöste received the Marian Smoluchowski and Emil Warburg Prize for Physics in 1999 and the Gay-Lussac-Humboldt Prize in 2006. In 2004, he was honorary professor at Nanjing University. In 2007, he became a knight of the Ordre national du Mérite.

Wöste holds honorary doctorates from the West University of Timișoara and the University of Lyon I. Wöste holds 13 patents and has over 320 scientific publications.

Bibliography

References 

1946 births
Knights of the Ordre national du Mérite
Academic staff of the Free University of Berlin
21st-century German physicists
20th-century German physicists
RWTH Aachen University alumni
University of Bern alumni
Living people
People from Emsland